Ljutići may refer to:
 Ljutići, Montenegro
 Ljutići, a settlement in Malinska-Dubašnica, Croatia

See also 
 Lutici, a federation of West Slavic Polabian tribes